Food processing is the transformation of agricultural products into food, or of one form of food into other forms.  Food processing includes many forms of processing foods, from grinding grain to make raw flour to home cooking to complex industrial methods used to make convenience foods. Some food processing methods play important roles in reducing food waste and improving food preservation, thus reducing the total environmental impact of agriculture and improving food security.

Primary food processing is necessary to make most foods edible, and secondary food processing turns the ingredients into familiar foods, such as bread. Tertiary food processing has been criticized for promoting overnutrition and obesity, containing too much sugar and salt, too little fiber, and otherwise being unhealthful in respect to dietary needs of humans and farm animals.

Processing levels

Primary food processing 

Primary food processing turns agricultural products, such as raw wheat kernels or livestock, into something that can eventually be eaten. This category includes ingredients that are produced by ancient processes such as drying, threshing, winnowing and milling grain, shelling nuts, and butchering animals for meat.  It also includes deboning and cutting meat, freezing and smoking fish and meat, extracting and filtering oils, canning food, preserving food through food irradiation, and candling eggs, as well as homogenizing and pasteurizing milk.

Contamination and spoilage problems in primary food processing can lead to significant public health threats, as the resulting foods are used so widely.  However, many forms of processing contribute to improved food safety and longer shelf life before the food spoils.  Commercial food processing uses control systems such as hazard analysis and critical control points (HACCP) and failure mode and effects analysis (FMEA) to reduce the risk of harm.

Secondary food processing 

Secondary food processing is the everyday process of creating food from ingredients that are ready to use. Baking bread, regardless of whether it is made at home, in a small bakery, or in a large factory, is an example of secondary food processing.  Fermenting fish and making wine, beer, and other alcoholic products are traditional forms of secondary food processing.  Sausages are a common form of secondary processed meat, formed by comminution (grinding) of meat that has already undergone primary processing. Most of the secondary food processing methods known to human kind are commonly described as cooking methods.

Tertiary food processing 
Tertiary food processing is the commercial production of what is commonly called processed food.  These are ready-to-eat or heat-and-serve foods, such as frozen meals and re-heated airline meals.

History
Food processing dates back to the prehistoric ages when crude processing incorporated fermenting, sun drying, preserving with salt, and various types of cooking (such as roasting, smoking, steaming, and oven baking), Such basic food processing involved chemical enzymatic changes to the basic structure of food in its natural form, as well served to build a barrier against surface microbial activity that caused rapid decay. Salt-preservation was especially common for foods that constituted warrior and sailors' diets until the introduction of canning methods. Evidence for the existence of these methods can be found in the writings of the ancient Greek, Chaldean, Egyptian and Roman civilizations as well as archaeological evidence from Europe, North and South America and Asia. These tried and tested processing techniques remained essentially the same until the advent of the industrial revolution. Examples of ready-meals also date back to before the preindustrial revolution, and include dishes such as Cornish pasty and Haggis. Both during ancient times and today in modern society these are considered processed foods.

Modern food processing technology developed in the 19th and 20th centuries was developed in a large part to serve military needs. In 1809, Nicolas Appert invented a hermetic bottling technique that would preserve food for French troops which ultimately contributed to the development of tinning, and subsequently canning by Peter Durand in 1810. Although initially expensive and somewhat hazardous due to the lead used in cans, canned goods would later become a staple around the world. Pasteurization, discovered by Louis Pasteur in 1864, improved the quality and safety of preserved foods and introduced the wine, beer, and milk preservation.

In the 20th century, World War II, the space race and the rising consumer society in developed countries contributed to the growth of food processing with such advances as spray drying, evaporation, juice concentrates, freeze drying and the introduction of artificial sweeteners, colouring agents, and such preservatives as sodium benzoate. In the late 20th century, products such as dried instant soups, reconstituted fruits and juices, and self cooking meals such as MRE food ration were developed. By the 20th century, automatic appliances like microwave oven, blender, and rotimatic paved way for convenience cooking.

In western Europe and North America, the second half of the 20th century witnessed a rise in the pursuit of convenience. Food processing companies marketed their products especially towards middle-class working wives and mothers. Frozen foods (often credited to Clarence Birdseye) found their success in sales of juice concentrates and "TV dinners". Processors utilised the perceived value of time to appeal to the postwar population, and this same appeal contributes to the success of convenience foods today.

Benefits and drawbacks

Benefits

Benefits of food processing include toxin removal, preservation, easing marketing and distribution tasks, and increasing food consistency. In addition, it increases yearly availability of many foods, enables transportation of delicate perishable foods across long distances and makes many kinds of foods safe to eat by de-activating spoilage and pathogenic micro-organisms. Modern supermarkets would not exist without modern food processing techniques, and long voyages would not be possible.

Processed foods are usually less susceptible to early spoilage than fresh foods and are better suited for long-distance transportation from the source to the consumer. When they were first introduced, some processed foods helped to alleviate food shortages and improved the overall nutrition of populations as it made many new foods available to the masses.

Processing can also reduce the incidence of food-borne disease. Fresh materials, such as fresh produce and raw meats, are more likely to harbour pathogenic micro-organisms (e.g. Salmonella) capable of causing serious illnesses.

The extremely varied modern diet is only truly possible on a wide scale because of food processing. Transportation of more exotic foods, as well as the elimination of much hard labor gives the modern eater easy access to a wide variety of food unimaginable to their ancestors.

The act of processing can often improve the taste of food significantly.

Mass production of food is much cheaper overall than individual production of meals from raw ingredients. Therefore, a large profit potential exists for the manufacturers and suppliers of processed food products. Individuals may see a benefit in convenience, but rarely see any direct financial cost benefit in using processed food as compared to home preparation.

Processed food freed people from the large amount of time involved in preparing and cooking "natural" unprocessed foods.  The increase in free time allows people much more choice in life style than previously allowed. In many families the adults are working away from home and therefore there is little time for the preparation of food based on fresh ingredients. The food industry offers products that fulfill many different needs: e.g. fully prepared ready meals that can be heated up in the microwave oven within a few minutes.

Modern food processing also improves the quality of life for people with allergies, diabetics, and other people who cannot consume some common food elements. Food processing can also add extra nutrients such as vitamins.

Drawbacks

Processing of food can decrease its nutritional density. The amount of nutrients lost depends on the food and processing method. For example, heat destroys vitamin C. Therefore, canned fruits possess less vitamin C than their fresh alternatives. The USDA conducted a study of nutrient retention in 2004, creating a table of foods, levels of preparation, and nutrition.

New research highlighting the importance to human health of a rich microbial environment in the intestine indicates that abundant food processing (not fermentation of foods) endangers that environment.

Using some food additives represents another safety concern. The health risks of any given additive vary greatly from person to person; for example using sugar as an additive endangers diabetics. In the European Union, only European Food Safety Authority (EFSA) approved food additives (e.g., sweeteners, preservatives, stabilizers) are permitted at specified levels for use in food products. Approved additives receive an E number (E for Europe), simplifying communication about food additives included in the ingredients list for all the different languages spoken in the EU.  As the effects of chemical additives are learned, changes to laws and regulatory practices are made to make such processed foods more safe.

Food processing is typically a mechanical process that utilizes extrusion, large mixing, grinding, chopping and emulsifying equipment in the production process. These processes introduce a number of contamination risks. Such contaminants are left over material from a previous operation, animal or human bodily fluids, microorganisms, nonmetallic and metallic fragments. Further processing of these contaminants will result in downstream equipment failure and the risk of ingestion by the consumer. Example: A mixing bowl or grinder is used over time, metal parts in contact with food will tend to fail and fracture. This type of failure will introduce into the product stream small to large metal contaminants. Further processing of these metal fragments will result in downstream equipment failure and the risk of ingestion by the consumer. Food manufacturers utilize industrial metal detectors to detect and reject automatically any metal fragment. Large food processors will utilize many metal detectors within the processing stream to reduce both damage to processing machinery as well as risk to consumer health.

Food processing does have some benefits, such as making food last longer and making products more convenient. However, heavily processed foods also have drawbacks. Whole foods and those that are only minimally processed, like frozen vegetables without any sauce, tend to be more healthy. An unhealthy diet high in fat, added sugar and salt, such as one containing much highly processed food, can increase the risk for cancer, type 2 diabetes and heart disease, according to the World Health Organization.

Added sodium 
One of the main sources for sodium in the diet is processed foods. Sodium, mostly in the form of sodium chloride, i.e. salt, is added to prevent spoilage, add flavor and enhance the texture of these foods. Some processed food may contain over 2% salt. Americans consume an average of 3436 milligrams of sodium per day, which is higher than the recommended limit of 2300 milligrams per day for healthy people, and more than twice the limit of 1500 milligrams per day for those at increased risk for heart disease.

Added sugars 
While it is not necessary to limit the sugars found naturally in whole, unprocessed foods like fresh fruit, eating too much added sugar found in many processed foods increases the risk of heart disease, obesity, cavities and Type 2 diabetes.

Nutrient losses 
Processing foods often involves nutrient losses, which can make it harder to meet the body's needs if these nutrients aren't added back through fortification or enrichment. For example, using high heat during processing can cause vitamin C losses. Another example is refined grains, which have less fiber, vitamins and minerals than whole grains. Eating refined grains, such as those found in many processed foods, instead of whole grains may increase the risk for high cholesterol, diabetes and obesity, according to a study published in "The American Journal of Clinical Nutrition" in December 2007.

Trans fats 
Foods that have undergone processing, including some commercial baked goods, desserts, margarine, frozen pizza, microwave popcorn and coffee creamers, sometimes contain trans fats. This is the most unhealthy type of fat, and may increase risk for high cholesterol, heart disease and stroke. The 2010 Dietary Guidelines for Americans recommends keeping trans fat intake as low as possible.

Other potential disadvantages 
Processed foods may actually take less energy to digest than whole foods, according to a study published in "Food & Nutrition Research" in 2010, meaning more of their food energy content is retained within the body. Processed foods also tend to be more allergenic than whole foods, according to a June 2004 "Current Opinion in Allergy and Clinical Immunology" article. Although the preservatives and other food additives used in many processed foods are generally recognized as safe, a few may cause problems for some individuals, including sulfites, artificial sweeteners, artificial colors and flavors, sodium nitrate, BHA and BHT, olestra, caffeine and monosodium glutamate — a flavor enhancer.

Performance parameters for food processing

When designing processes for the food industry the following performance parameters may be taken into account:
 Hygiene, e.g. measured by number of micro-organisms per mL of finished product. 
 Energy efficiency measured e.g. by “ton of steam per ton of sugar produced”. 
 Minimization of waste, measured e.g. by “percentage of peeling loss during the peeling of potatoes”. 
 Labour used, measured e.g. by “number of working hours per ton of finished product”. 
 Minimization of cleaning stops measured e.g. by “number of hours between cleaning stops”.

Industries
Food processing industries and practices include the following:

 Cannery
 Fish processing
 Food packaging plant
 Industrial rendering
 Meat packing plant
 Slaughterhouse
 Sugar industry

See also

 Brewery
 Canning
 Clean-in-place
 Dietary supplement
 Enzyme
 Flavoring
 Food additive
 Food and Bioprocess Technology
 Food coloring
 Food extrusion
 Food fortification
 Food quality
 Food rheology
 Food safety
 Food science
 Food storage
 Genetically modified food
 Good manufacturing practice
 List of cooking techniques
 Material handling
 Nutraceutical
 Pasteurization
 Pink slime
 Shelf life
 Snap freezing
 Ultra-high temperature processing
 Ultra-processed food
 Washdown

Notes and references

Bibliography
 Fábricas de alimentos, 9th edition . 
 Nutritional evaluation of food processing,
 Food preservation 2nd edition, by Norman W. Desrosier.

External links
 
 Frozen food trends

 
Agricultural economics
Food industry
Food science
Processing
Industrial processes
Packaging

de:Lebensmittelindustrie#Industrielle Lebensmittelverarbeitung